Mell is a given name and a surname. Notable persons with that name include:

Persons with the given name
 Mell Kilpatrick (1902–1962), American photographer
 Mell Lazarus (1927–2016), American cartoonist
 Mell Reasco (born 2002), Ecuadorian tennis player

Persons with the surname
 Davis Mell (1604-1662), English clockmaker and violinist
 Deb Mell (born 1968), American politician, daughter of Richard Mell
 Eila Mell, American fashion journalist
 Gertrud Maria Mell (1947–2016), Swedish musician, composer, and sea captain
 John Mell, 1670s English hospital "keeper"
 Luísa Mell (born 1978), Brazilian actress and businesswoman
 Marisa Mell (1939–1992), Austrian actress
 Max Mell (1882–1971), Austrian writer
 Randle Mell, American actor, ex-husband of Mary McDonnell 
 Richard Mell (born 1938), American politician, father of Deb Mell
 Robert Mell (1872–1941), British trade unionist and politician
 Rudolf Mell (1878–1970), German zoologist and entomologist
 Stewart Mell (born 1957), English footballer

Fictional characters
 Mell Rhodes, a character from the visual novel The House in Fata Morgana

See also
 Mell (disambiguation)